The Conservatives are a Luxembourgish political party that was founded on 21 March 2017 in the municipality of Pétange.

According to the founding statute of The Conservatives, they understand themselves as a party on a conservative and patriotic basis. According to the basic program, the party sees itself connected with the political philosophy of the state philosopher and politician Edmund Burke.

The party president is the former Alternative Democratic Reform Party (ADR) politician Joe Thein, who after being expelled from the ADR, started his own party.

At the extraordinary national congress of 10 April 2017, the party statutes and basic program were adopted, as well as the party committee was elected. Joe Thein was elected as national president.

In the 2017 communal elections, the party ran for the first time and only in the municipality of Pétange, but did not receive a seat with 2.40%.

In the 2018 general election, the party ran for the first and only time in the Sud district, but did not receive a seat with 0.52%.

In the 2019 European Parliament election, the party ran for the first time nationwide, but did not receive a seat with 0.53%.

The party has about 100 members .

References 

Centre-right parties in Europe
Conservative parties in Europe
National conservative parties
Political parties in Luxembourg
Political parties established in 2017
Right-wing parties in Europe